Tea for Two is a 1950 American musical romantic comedy film directed by David Butler. The screenplay by Harry Clork was inspired by the 1925 stage musical No, No, Nanette, although the plot was changed considerably from the original book by Otto Harbach and Frank Mandel; and the score by Harbach, Irving Caesar, and Vincent Youmans was augmented with songs by other composers.

Plot
Set as a flashback to the Roaring Twenties, Uncle Max (S. Z. Sakall) expresses displeasure to his grandniece and grandnephew, who are making fun of their parents' outdated fashions, and begins telling the story of Nanette Carter (Doris Day), a Westchester County, New York socialite with show business aspirations. She offers to invest $25,000 in a Broadway show if her boyfriend, producer Larry Blair (Billy De Wolfe), casts her in the starring role. What she doesn't realize is that Larry is two-timing her with ingenue Beatrice Darcy (Patrice Wymore), whom he envisions as the lead. When he accepts Nanette's offer, she imposes upon her wealthy, penny-pinching uncle, J. Maxwell Bloomhaus (Sakall) to lend her the money.

Uncle Max is willing to do so, on one condition. For the next 24 hours, Nanette must answer "no" to every question she's asked. Comic complications ensue when the cast arrives at Nanette's estate to rehearse, as composer and pianist Jimmy Smith (Gordon MacRae), who has romantic designs on Nanette, falls victim to the bet she's made with her uncle. Nanette wins, only to discover that Uncle Max lost all his money in the stock market crash. The only person still solvent is attorney William Early (Bill Goodwin). So, Nanette's assistant Pauline Hastings (Eve Arden) sets out to charm him into backing the show — and succeeds. The show 'No, No, Nanette' opens and is a rousing success.

Then, in a sudden flash to the present time, Uncle Max finishes his story right before Nanette and Jimmy return home to their two children.

Cast

 Doris Day as Nanette Carter
 Gordon MacRae as Jimmy Smith
 Gene Nelson as Tommy Trainor
 Eve Arden as Pauline Hastings
 Billy De Wolfe as Larry Blair
 Bill Goodwin as William Early
 Virginia Gibson as Mabel Wiley
 S. Z. Sakall as J. Maxwell Bloomhaus
 Patrice Wymore as Beatrice Darcy

Song list

 "I Know That You Know" - sung by Doris Day and Gene Nelson
 "Crazy Rhythm" - sung by Patrice Wymore and Gene Nelson
 "I Only Have Eyes for You" - sung by Gordon MacRae
 "Tea for Two" - sung by Doris Day and Gordon MacRae
 "I Want to Be Happy" - sung by Doris Day and Gordon MacRae
 "Do Do Do" by - sung by Doris Day and Gordon MacRae
 "Oh Me! Oh My!" - sung by Doris Day and Gene Nelson
 "Charleston" - danced to by Billy De Wolfe
 "Tea for Two (Reprise)" - sung by Doris Day and Gene Nelson
 "Here in My Arms" - sung by Doris Day
 "No, No, Nanette" - sung by Doris Day and Gene Nelson
 "Tea for Two (Finale)" - sung by Doris Day and Gordon MacRae

Production
The film was the first in which Doris Day received top billing and marked the first time she danced on-screen.

This was director Butler and leading lady Day's second collaboration, following It's a Great Feeling the previous year. The two went on to work together on Lullaby of Broadway, April in Paris, By the Light of the Silvery Moon, and Calamity Jane.

Ray Heindorf served as musical director for the film, and the musical sequences were choreographed by Gene Nelson, Eddie Prinz, and LeRoy Prinz. Art direction was by Douglas Bacon and the costume designer was Leah Rhodes.

Both Gordon MacRae and Gene Nelson appeared together in the film version of Oklahoma! (1955).

Box office
According to accounting records at Warner Bros., the film earned $2,322,000 domestically and $1,330,000 foreign.

Critical reception
In his review in The New York Times, Bosley Crowther called the film "pleasant entertainment," "a sprightly show," and "quite a genial production" and added, "Miss Day and Mr. MacRae . . . complement each other like peanut butter and jelly."

Time wrote, "[It] sheds a Technicolor tear for the good old days of plus fours, prohibition and the stock-market crash. The story . . . employs nearly every musical-comedy cliché . . . as hot-weather entertainment, Tea for Two is at its best when concentrating on the old tunes of Vincent Youmans, George Gershwin and Roger Wolfe Kahn."

Awards and honors
Gene Nelson won the Golden Globe Award for New Star of the Year – Actor for his work on Tea for Two.

References

External links

 
 
 
 
 
 Review of Tea for Two (1950) at TV Guide

1950 films
1950 musical comedy films
1950 romantic comedy films
1950s English-language films
1950s romantic musical films
American films based on plays
American musical comedy films
American romantic comedy films
American romantic musical films
Films based on musicals
Films directed by David Butler
Films set in 1929
Films set in New York (state)
Films set in the Roaring Twenties
Warner Bros. films
1950s American films